Javier Torres Gómez (born 9 January 1970) is a Spanish retired footballer who played mainly as a right back.

Most of his professional career was associated with Valladolid, as both a player and manager, coaching in several capacities and categories.

Playing career
Youth years comprised, Madrid-born Torres Gómez spent six years with Real Madrid, playing four seasons with the B-team, three of them in Segunda División. He scored a career-best five goals in 38 games in 1992–93 as the reserves finished in sixth position, and started his career as a midfielder.

In summer 1993, Gómez signed for Real Valladolid, where he would remain for the rest of his career. He made his La Liga debut on 5 September in a 0–1 home loss against Sporting de Gijón, but only appeared in two matches in his first year due to a serious injury.

A regular first-team unit in the following decade, Gómez never played in less than 34 league games from 2000 to 2004, with the latter campaign ending in top-flight relegation. After one more season in the second level the 35-year-old retired from football, as the Castile and León club's second player with more top division appearances.

Coaching career
In the following years, Torres Gómez continued working with Valladolid: in 2008, he was named youth system coordinator and, two years later, joined Antonio Gómez's coaching staff in the first team. On 29 November 2010, following the head coach's dismissal, he was named interim manager, leading the team in the 0–0 away draw against FC Barcelona B.

Subsequently, Gómez was appointed manager of the reserves in Tercera División, accumulating with his work in the club's cantera. On 8 July 2014, after achieving promotion via the play-offs, he moved to Villarreal CF C from Tercera División in the same capacity; subsequently, he joined Celta de Vigo B, but was sacked in February following ten games without a win and was replaced by Alejandro Menéndez.

Managerial statistics

References

External links

1970 births
Living people
Footballers from Madrid
Spanish footballers
Association football defenders
Association football midfielders
La Liga players
Segunda División players
Segunda División B players
Real Madrid Castilla footballers
Real Valladolid players
Spain youth international footballers
Spanish football managers
Segunda División managers
Segunda División B managers
Real Valladolid managers